Jeti Ice Hall is an ice arena in Tallinn, Estonia.

The hall was opened in 2000.

The hall's capacity is 100.

The hall has an ice arena with dimensions of 30 x 60 m.

The hall is used by the following ice hockey clubs: HC Magic Wings Tallinn, HC Viking Tallinn, HK Mark Winner Tallinn, HK Crazy Bears.

From 2005, the hall is a place for Tallinn Cup curling tournament.

References

External links
 

Indoor arenas in Estonia
Sports venues in Tallinn
Indoor ice hockey venues in Estonia
2000 establishments in Estonia
Sports venues completed in 2000